Rolling Stones: Live at the Max (also known as Stones at the Max) is a concert film by the Rolling Stones released in 1991. It was specially filmed in IMAX during the Urban Jungle Tour in Europe in 1990. It was the first concert movie shot in the IMAX format.

Rolling Stones: Live at the Max premiered 25 October 1991 in Los Angeles at the California Museum of Science and Industry. In the UK it was shown at the National Museum of Photography, Film and Television in Bradford, Yorkshire in 1992. The tagline was "Larger than life".

Production 

Rolling Stones: Live at the Max was the first feature-length film ever to be filmed in IMAX format.

Imaging fed to the jumbotrons at concerts came from trucks where switching equipment was used to control live feeds from an army of video cameras. Midway through post-production, the request came to use some of this video that had been recorded on 3/4" tape in the final IMAX film. This required a series of tests to improve the fidelity of this video footage so that it could be mixed in with the footage captured on IMAX 70 mm film without a significant drop in quality. Test negatives were processed in New York and prints were returned to Toronto for screening at the IMAX theatre at Ontario Place. After many tries, a process was created to improve the video enough to be used. The final release included approximately 6 minutes of this footage.

Originally shot with 8 IMAX cameras outfitted with the first long load film magazines, 5 concerts were recorded in 3 cities. The band's repertoire was so extensive and the setlist so variable that it was impossible to ensure that every song would be played in every show, despite the large number of magazines and the difficulty of loading them. Trying to cut the film on a traditional flatbed editor proved impossible, so an EditDroid, an early digital non-linear editing system developed, and custom configured by Lucasfilm, was used. 35mm workprints were assembled, transferred to video, and recorded to laser videodiscs that the EditDroid could work from. The 8-headed Droid could load all databases and imaging for a single song in all concert locations. The editors could jump to any point in a song, see what was available (or not), then jump to the same spot in all subsequent concerts.

Home video 

VHS, DVD and Blu-ray versions were released under the title Rolling Stones: Live at the Max.

See also the live album Flashpoint, released in 1991, from the same tour.

Track listing 
All tracks by Mick Jagger and Keith Richards.
 "Continental Drift"
 "Start Me Up"
 "Sad Sad Sad"
 "Tumbling Dice"
 "Ruby Tuesday"
 "Rock and a Hard Place"
 "Honky Tonk Women"
 "You Can't Always Get What You Want"
 "Happy"
 "Paint It Black"
 "2000 Light Years from Home"
 "Sympathy for the Devil"
 "Street Fighting Man"
 "It's Only Rock 'n Roll (But I Like It)"
 "Brown Sugar"
 "(I Can't Get No) Satisfaction"

Stadium venues and dates 
The list below reflects the sound recording dates. The video is a mix of the listed shows, plus footage from 29 July 1990.

Personnel 
The Rolling Stones
Mick Jagger – lead vocals, guitars, percussion
Keith Richards – vocals, guitars
Ronnie Wood – guitars
Bill Wyman – bass guitar
Charlie Watts – drums

Additional personnel
Matt Clifford – keyboards, backing vocals, French horn, percussion
Chuck Leavell – keyboards, backing vocals, percussion
Bobby Keys – saxophone
Horns by The Uptown Horns – Arno Hecht, Paul Litteral, Bob Funk, Crispen Cloe
Bernard Fowler – backing vocals, percussion
Sophia Jones – backing vocals
Lorelei McBroom – backing vocals

Certifications

References

External links 
 

1991 films
1994 video albums
Concert films
Films directed by David Douglas (director)
Films directed by Julien Temple
Films directed by Roman Kroitor
IMAX films
Live video albums
The Rolling Stones films
The Rolling Stones video albums
1990s English-language films
1990s British films